Pomponio is a historic Italian first name which may refer to a number of Italian historical figures:

Historic
Julius Pomponius Laetus
Pomponio Algerio
Pomponio Amidano
Pomponio Nenna
Pomponio Amalteo

Additionally Pomponio is the common name of an early California rebel/bandit
José Pomponio Lupugeym

Contemporary
Dion Pomponio (musician)

Italian masculine given names